Sphenomorphus tanneri, Tanner’s skink,  is a species of skink found in the Solomon Islands, New Britain, and the Bismarck archipelago.

References

tanneri
Taxa named by Allen Eddy Greer
Taxa named by Frederick Stanley Parker
Reptiles described in 1967
Reptiles of the Solomon Islands
Reptiles of Papua New Guinea